The 1905 Kentucky University Pioneers football team was an American football team that represented Kentucky University (now known as Transylvania University) as an independent during the 1905 college football season. In their first season under head coach Curtis Redden, the team compiled a 7–0–3 record.

Schedule

References

Kentucky University
Transylvania Pioneers football seasons
College football undefeated seasons
Kentucky University Pioneers football